The BNXT League, for sponsorship reasons the betFirst BNXT League, is a professional basketball league in Belgium and the Netherlands. The league is the first tier in both the Dutch and Belgian system, replacing the DBL and PBL. The inaugural season was the 2021–22 season, which started in September 2021.

The BNXT League plays national playoffs as well as a cross-border playoffs to determine a Dutch champion, Belgian champion and BNXT champion.

History
On 10 December 2020, it was announced that the Belgian Pro Basketball League and Dutch Basketball League would merge to form a new multinational league. All clubs from the Dutch DBL voted for, while 9 of 10 teams in Belgium voted in favor of the decision. Serious talks about the initiative had been ongoing since fall 2019. On 20 May 2021, the new name "BNXT League" and logo of the league were announced.

The league started its inaugural season amidst an ongoing COVID-19 pandemic and a great number of games had to be played behind locked doors as a result of national lockdowns. On 11 June 2022, ZZ Leiden were crowned the inaugural BNXT champions.

Sponsorship
On 10 September 2021, the league announced its first name sponsorship when Belgian betting company betFirst signed to become naming sponsor for three seasons.

Competition formula
The league consists of different stages. In the first stage, teams play each other home and away in the national regular season. After this, the teams are divided in the Elite Gold and Elite Silver group for the cross-border season. Next, the teams from the Elite Gold and the best team from the Elite Silver play in the national playoffs to compete for the national championships. At the same time the BNXT Play-offs start to determine the league winner.

Teams
The following 20 teams will play in the 2022–23 season:

Stadiums and locations 

Note: Table lists in alphabetical order.

Former teams

BNXT champions

National champions

Netherlands

Belgium

Broadcasting partners
BNXT.tv (online)
NPO 1
Ziggo Sport
Sporza
Proximus

Notes

References

External links
Official website

Basketball leagues in Belgium
Basketball leagues in the Netherlands
 
Multi-national professional sports leagues
Sports leagues established in 2020
2020 establishments in Europe